The Fairgrounds Grandstand Arena is a 7,000-seat multi-purpose arena at the OC Fair & Event Center in Costa Mesa, California. 

It was home to the Orange County Buzz basketball team of the American Basketball Association.  It is also a concert venue, including several residencies of Weird Al Yankovic.

References

Indoor arenas in California
Basketball venues in California
American Basketball Association (2000–present) venues
Sports venues in Costa Mesa, California